Got7 (commonly stylized in all caps) is a South Korean boy band formed by JYP Entertainment. The group is composed of seven members: Jay B, Mark, Jackson, Jinyoung, Youngjae, BamBam, and Yugyeom. Got7 debuted in January 2014 with the release of their first EP Got It?, which peaked at number two on the Gaon Album Chart and number one on Billboard's World Albums Chart. The group gained attention also for their live performances, which often include elements of martial arts tricking and street dancing.

In late 2014, Got7 signed with Sony Music Entertainment Japan and ventured into the Japanese market to release their debut Japanese-language single "Around the World". They returned to South Korea a month later to release their first full-length studio album Identify, which topped the nation's charts. In 2015, Got7 released the EPs Just Right and Mad, which yielded their most commercially successful single, "Just Right". In 2016, they moved into the Japanese market with a full-length Japanese studio album, Moriagatteyo, which entered the Oricon Albums Chart at number three.

Their fifth Korean EP Flight Log: Departure and their second full-length studio album Flight Log: Turbulence were both chart-toppers, and the 2017 EP Flight Log: Arrival, the third and final part of the group's Flight Log series, was their first album to sell more than 300,000 copies.

The group departed from JYP Entertainment in January 2021, following the expiration of their contract with the agency.

History

2009–2013: JJ Project and formation
In 2009, Jay B and Jinyoung were cast into JYP Entertainment after passing open auditions. In 2010, Mark and BamBam were respectively scouted by JYP scouts in Los Angeles, USA and Bangkok, Thailand. That same year, Yugyeom became a JYP trainee after he was offered an opportunity at his dance school. In December, Jackson passed JYP's overseas audition in Hong Kong, but he did not start his training until the summer of 2011.

Jay B and Jinyoung, then known by the stage name Junior, made their debut as actors in the 2012 television drama Dream High 2. In May, they debuted as the pop duo JJ Project with the single "Bounce". The duo appeared again as actors for the 2013 drama, When a Man Falls in Love.

Meanwhile, Mark, Jackson, BamBam and Yugyeom prepared for their debut together as a group. The quartet made their first television appearance on the fourth episode of Mnet's reality-survival program Who is Next: WIN, which aired on September 6, 2013. The seventh and final member to join the group was Youngjae, who had only been a trainee for seven months.

2014: Debut with Got It?, Got Love, Identify and Around the World

JYP Entertainment announced Got7 on January 1, 2014, debuting their first boy group since 2PM in 2008. A tentative name of the group was "Get7", but was changed because it didn't sound good. According to Park Jin-young, "Got7" originated from best-selling first-generation group g.o.d, as Park was supposed to debut with them as a six-member mix-gender group and used the working name "Got6". The final name includes the lucky number seven, meaning "seven lucky people come together".

Got7 was described as a hip-hop group that incorporates martial arts tricking and b-boying styles in their performances. This style drew comparisons to their senior group, 2PM, who are well known for their acrobatic dance styles. Thus, the group drew attention even before the official debut and received the nickname "post 2PM".

Got7 released their first EP, Got It?, on January 20, 2014. The album shot to No. 1 on Billboard's World Albums Chart and was No. 2 on the Gaon Album Chart. Got7 made their official music program debut on January 16, 2014, through Mnet's M Countdown, performing their debut single "Girls Girls Girls". Shortly after their debut, the group signed a contract with Japan's Sony Music Entertainment and launched a showcase in Japan in front of 9,000 fans.

On June 23, Got7 released their second EP, Got Love, with its title song "A", which was written and produced by J.Y. Park. For their new EP, the group opted to show a brighter and more colorful image than their martial arts and b-boy style choreography emphasized at debut. In November 2014, the group released their first full-length album, Identify, as well as the music video for its title track, "Stop Stop It". Identify topped Gaon's Weekly Album Sales Chart in its first week and "Stop Stop It" peaked at number four on Billboard's World Digital Songs chart. In October, Got7 held their first Japan Tour, "Got7 1st Japan Tour 2014", and made their Japanese debut on October 22 with their single Around the World. This included the hip-hop track "So Lucky", composed and written by 2PM's Jun. K.

2015: Love Train, Just Right, Laugh Laugh Laugh and Mad
In January, Got7 were awarded the "New Artist Award" at the 29th Golden Disc Awards and at the 24th Seoul Music Awards. In the same month, Got7 starred in their own web drama Dream Knight, co-produced by Youku Tudou and JYP Pictures, and featuring actress Song Ha-yoon as the female lead role. The drama tells the story of a girl who shares dreams, love and friendship with a group of mysterious boys with magic powers and gathered close to 13 million hits in total. The show received the "Best Drama Award", "Best Director Award" and "Rising Star Award" at the K-Web Fest in July.

On June 10, 2015, the group released their second Japanese single "Love Train", which debuted at No. 4 on the Oricon Singles Chart. The single contains a "Love Train", the original Japanese song O.M.G. and the two tracks' instrumental renditions. The group released their third EP, Just Right, on July 13, 2015. The title track, "Just Right", peaked at No. 3 on Billboard's World Digital Songs chart, remaining in the top three for two consecutive weeks. As of January 8, 2020, the "Just Right" music video on YouTube has over 300 million views, making it the group's first music video to reach this milestone.

Got7 released their third Japanese single "Laugh Laugh Laugh" with its B-side "Be My Girl" on September 23. It sold over 35,000 album copies in the first week of its release and made its debut at No. 1 on the Oricon's singles chart.

The group released their fourth EP, Mad, and the music video for its title track, "If You Do", on September 29. They followed up this release with their first repackaged album, Mad: Winter Edition, on November 23, with the three additional tracks, "Confession Song", "Everyday" and "To. Star".

2016: Flight Log: Departure, Fly Tour and Flight Log: Turbulence
 On February 3, 2016 Got7 released their first full-length Japanese studio album titled Moriagatteyo. The lead single is co-composed by 2PM's Jang Wooyoung and features a bside co-composed by Jun.K also of 2PM. The album placed number two on the Oricon charts. The album features 12 original Japanese songs which includes songs from their first three Japanese singles. The album also features 4 Japanese versions of their Korean singles  "Girls Girls Girls", "A", "Stop Stop It", and "Just Right".
On February 15, 2016, Got7 and labelmate Twice were confirmed as new clothing ambassadors for NBA Style Korea. On March 21, 2016, Got7's fifth EP, Flight Log: Departure, and its title track, "Fly", were released. On March 31, Got7 became the first Korean act to chart on Billboard's Artist 100 since Psy (peaking at No. 88), entering the chart at No. 45. On April 9, 2016, Got7 entered the Billboard Artist 100 chart at No. 45, becoming only the second K-pop act chart on the ranking. Flight Log: Departure debuted at No. 2 on the Billboard Heatseekers Album Chart and on the Billboard World Albums Chart. On April 12, Got7 digitally released "Home Run", the second title track for their Flight Log: Departure album – member Jay B participated in writing and composing the song.

Got7 participated in a Japanese educational TV program beginning in April. In NHK Educational TV's  they played "Soon-Ock Kim's School" students role and performed humorous Hangul skits every week. They appeared in the textbooks monthly as well. They appeared regularly for 2 years until March 2018.

Got7 held their first solo concert, "Fly Tour", from April 29–30 in Seoul, with the tour continuing on to dates in China, Japan, Thailand, Singapore and the United States throughout the summer.

In the first half of the year, the group became brand model in Thailand for IT'S SKIN, softlens brand BAUSCH+LOMB, and Est Cola. For BAUSCH+LOMB, Mark, BamBam and Jinyoung starred in a short film titled Sanctuary, which was released on May 11 together with three Thai actors.

On September 27, Got7 released their second studio album titled Flight Log: Turbulence, which consists of thirteen songs, including the title track "Hard Carry". The members have contributed to the composition and lyrics of 11 tracks on the album. It sold 200,000 album copies in South Korea and debuted at No. 1 on Billboard's World Albums Chart, selling 2,000 copies in the U.S.

On November 16, Got7 released their first Japanese EP titled Hey Yah. The album took third place on the Oricon chart and is the first Japanese album in which members took part in writing and composing. The album also features a track produced by 2PM's Jang Wooyoung who has previously worked with Got7.

Fly charted at No. 15 on Billboard year-end World Albums chart, marking Got7's first appearance on the chart, and they also ranked at No. 6 on the Billboard year-end World Albums Artists chart, making them the highest-charting act other than BTS. To date, only G-Dragon, Shinee, 2NE1 and EXO have landed on this chart.

2017: Flight Log: Arrival, My Swagger, 7 For 7 and Turn Up
On March 13, the third album of the Flight Log trilogy, Flight Log: Arrival, was released. The album sold 220,000 copies in pre-orders alone, and, with 310,000 sold by April 14, it exceeded the total sales of 230,000 copies for Flight Log: Turbulence. Moreover, Flight Log: Arrival placed first on Gaon and Hanteo's album charts in March, topping Billboard's World Album Chart.

On May 24, the group released a new single in Japan, "My Swagger", which topped Billboard's Japan Single Chart and took second place on Oricon on the day of release.

On October 10, the group released their seventh EP titled 7 for 7. The title track "You Are" is co-composed and co-written by group leader Jay B, the album also features songs written and composed by the members themselves. Following the release of their album, title track "You Are" topped real-time music charts in South Korea.

On November 15, the group released their second Japanese EP titled "Turn Up". Simultaneously they held their tour in Japan titled "Got7Japan Tour 2017: Turn Up". This is the group's first album and tour in which member Jackson did not participate in due to health concerns and conflicting schedules, resulting in a halt on all his Japanese schedules with the exception of special occasions.

On December 7, Got7 re-released their EP 7 for 7 as a holiday themed "present edition" featuring new photos of the members. Alongside the re-release of the album, the group released a performance video for their b-side "Teenager", which was composed by member Jay B.

2018: Eyes On You, second world tour, THE New Era, and Present: You
On February 4, Got7 was selected as a global ambassador for luxury brand Shinsegae Duty Free.

On March 9, Got7 was appointed honorary ambassador for Korea's National Fire Agency.

On March 12, the group had their comeback through their eighth EP entitled Eyes On You. The title track "Look" is co-composed and co-written by Jay B, with the other members contributing to the album as well. Following the release of the album, "Look" topped major real time charts in South Korea, becoming their most successful track on music charts since debut. The album also topped the iTunes international album charts in twenty countries and the Hanteo's daily chart on March 12 for physical album sales. "Look" entered the Gaon Download Chart in third, while Eyes on You topped the physical album shipments chart for the week from March 11 through 17. The album also debuted on Billboard World Albums Chart at number 2. Eyes on You sold over 300,000 copies in South Korea and was certified platinum by Gaon Chart and the Korean Music Content Association (KMCA). In the same month, Got7 has collaborated with global sport brand Adidas through a special performance video of the title song of Got7's new album Eyes On You, "Look", to commemorate the release of the new album. Also, Adidas opened a special pop-up store under the name of '7 Eye-catching Adicolors' at Times Square in Seoul for 4 days and held various events.

In April, Got7 was appointed as a global ambassador of Korean beauty brand The Face Shop across 28 countries. 

On May 4–6, Got7 kicked off their 2018 Eyes On You World Tour in Seoul. The tour dates continued throughout the summer selling out shows in Asia, Europe, North America, and South America. While touring the United States, Got7 became the first K-pop group to perform at Brooklyn's Barclays Center.

Throughout May and June Got7 simultaneously held a tour in Japan while on their world tour titled "Got7 Japan Fan Connecting Hall Tour 2018: THE New Era" in support of their Japanese single "THE New Era", which was released on June 20. The single topped the Oricon charts placing number one on the daily charts and on Billboard Japan.

On September 17, Got7 released their third studio album entitled Present: You. Following the release of the album, title track "Lullaby" topped major real time charts in South Korea. While promoting the album, Got7 became the third male group to hold a comeback show on Mnet through their television channel, Facebook, and YouTube. The "Got7 Comeback Show" aired two hours after the album was released. Present: You was certified platinum by Gaon Chart on November 8, 2018, after selling over 250,000 copies.

On September 21, Got7 was selected as a new model for global sport brand Adidas Originals.

2019: I Won't Let You Go, Jus2 sub-unit, Spinning Top, Love Loop, and Call My Name 
On January 30, Got7 released their third Japanese extended play I Won't Let You Go, which debuted at No. 1 on the Oricon Daily Album Chart with estimated sales of 22,948 copies, holding the position for the entire week and eventually topping the Oricon Weekly Album Chart for the week January 28 – February 3.

On February 13, JYP Entertainment hinted at Got7's second sub-unit duo, which later revealed to include members Jay B and Yugyeom named Jus2. They released their music video titled Focus on Me on March 3, 2019 and subsequently released their debut album, Focus the following day. They also had their first tour, Jus2 <FOCUS> Premiere Showcase Tour, stopping at 7 cities in Asia.

The group released their ninth extended play, Spinning Top: Between Security & Insecurity, on May 20, 2019. They sold 64,148 copies on the first day and 214,125 copies in the first week, becoming the first group from JYP Entertainment to sell 2 million albums since debut. The EP debuted on the Billboard World Albums chart at No. 5, also coming in at No. 9 on Billboard's Heatseekers Albums chart. They then embarked on their third world tour from June 15 to October 26, titled Got7 2019 World Tour 'Keep Spinning'. They stopped at 12 countries in North America, South America and Europe, including Australia and the Philippines. During its North American stop, Got7 appeared on the Today Show on June 26, becoming the first Korean group to perform on the show.

On July 31, Got7 released their fourth Japanese extended play, Love Loop, which debuted at No. 2 on Oricon's daily albums chart with estimated sales of 15,257 copies, raising at No. 1 on August 3. To commemorate the release, a special pop-up shop with a dedicated menu was opened in Tokyo and Osaka from July 30 to August 12. The group held the Our Loop Tour from July 30 to August 18. In September additional dates for the Keep Spinning World Tour were added, indicating they were going to continue the world tour in 2020 and stopping at 5 different Asian countries.

The group released their tenth extended play, Call My Name, and its lead single "You Calling My Name" on November 4, 2019. They sold 100,341 copies on the first day and 224,459 copies in the first week, and became the first artist from JYP Entertainment to sell over 100,000 copies on the first day. The EP debuted on the Billboard World Albums chart at No. 5, and also topped the Gaon Weekly Chart and the Hanteo Weekly Chart.

On November 5, Got7 were awarded the Korea Volunteering Grand Award at the 2019 Korea Sharing Volunteer Awards for their contribution to the local community.

At the end of the year, they won their first Grand Prize (daesang) at the 4th Asia Artist Awards for Performance of the Year. They also ended the year at No. 4 on Billboard's Year-End Social 50 Artists Chart. In December, tickets were released for the Bangkok leg of the Keep Spinning World Tour at the Rajamangala National Stadium, and sold out within two hours. Due to high demand they announced an additional concert date, and would become the second K-pop group to perform two shows at the venue.

2020–2021: Dye, Breath of Love: Last Piece and departure from JYP
On April 20, 2020, Got7 released their eleventh EP, Dye, along with its lead single, "Not By the Moon". They sold 159,098 copies of their EP on the first day and 281,791 copies in the first week, breaking their personal record for first day and first week sales. The EP also debuted on the Billboard World Albums chart at No. 4. It has sold over 450,000 copies, becoming their bestselling album to date. On November 30, Got7 released their fourth studio album, Breath of Love: Last Piece, along with its lead single, "Last Piece". A pre-release single, "Breath", was released on November 23.

On January 10, 2021, JYP Entertainment initially announced that their exclusive contracts would expire. Three days prior to the announcement, other reports have said Yugyeom had left the label for AOMG, despite JYP later clarifying it was difficult for them to confirm what agency the members were in contact with.

On January 11, JYP Entertainment released an official statement reiterating that all members will leave the company after their exclusive contract expires on January 19, 2021.

2021–present: "Encore", solo activities and comeback with Got7
On February 19, 2021, Got7 released a teaser for an upcoming single called "Encore" on a new YouTube channel. It was released the following day.

The members focused on solo activities for the following year; then, it was reported that they would return with their new EP on May. On May 6, 2022, they revealed a new logo and launched new social media accounts under Warner Music Korea.

On May 8, they announced a comeback by dropping the cover of their new self-titled EP, Got7. It was preceded by the "Got7 Homecoming 2022 Fancon", which was held on May 21–22 both online and offline, at SK Olympic Handball Gymnasium.  On May 23, Got7 released the album and the music video of the title song, "Nanana".

Members
 Mark
 Jay B — Leader
 Jackson
 Jinyoung
 Youngjae
 BamBam
 Yugyeom

Discography

 Identify (2014)
 Moriagatteyo (2016)
 Flight Log: Turbulence (2016)
 Present: You (2018)
 Breath of Love: Last Piece (2020)

Filmography

Dream Knight (2015)

Awards and nominations

Concert tours

Fly Tour (2016)
Eyes on You Tour (2018)
Keep Spinning World Tour (2019)

Philanthropy 
In February 2017, donation area G+ Star Zone re-opened, decorated with life-size portraits of Got7, to raise funds in their name to help financially disadvantaged teenagers.

In April 2019, the group donated 30 million won to the Hope Bridge National Reunion Relief Association to help people affected by the forest fires in Gangwon-do. For the Keep Spinning World Tour in 2019, they launched the "Keep Spinning, Keep Dreaming with Got7" project together with the Make-A-Wish Foundation to comfort seriously ill children and give them the opportunity to attend their concerts and meet them.

Notes

References

External links

 

 
2014 establishments in South Korea
JYP Entertainment artists
K-pop music groups
MAMA Award winners
Musical groups established in 2014
Musical groups from Seoul
South Korean boy bands
South Korean dance music groups
South Korean hip hop groups